A Shadow of All Night Falling is a fantasy novel by Glen Cook published in 1979.

Plot summary

Reception
Greg Costikyan reviewed A Shadow of All Night Falling in Ares Magazine #2 and commented that "Cook has managed to avoid most of the traps into which fantasy writers tend to fall. His language, while striking, is not awkwardly archaic; he communicates some of the awesomeness that is the province of epic fantasy without seeming silly or mundane; his magic is believable and not trivial. He also manages to create sympathetic characters – a difficult task in epic fantasy – and his prose is clear and well-executed. A Shadow of All Night Falling is by no means a classic, but it shows great promise."

Reviews
 Review by Roz Kaveney (1981) in Foundation, #21 February 1981
Magia i Miecz #65 (May 1999) (Polish)

References

1979 American novels
1979 fantasy novels
American fantasy novels
Berkley Books books